Alejandro "Álex" Cantero Sánchez (born 8 June 2000) is a Spanish professional footballer who plays as a winger for Levante.

Club career
A youth product of CD Brunete and Real Madrid CF, Cantero joined the youth academy of Levante UD in 2016. He signed a professional contract with Levante on 19 February 2019, for four years. 

Cantero began his senior career as a stalwart with Levante's reserve side in Segunda División B. He made his senior debut with Levante in a 2–0 La Liga loss to Celta de Vigo on 30 April 2021.

On 24 June 2021, Cantero was promoted to the main squad for the 2021–22 campaign.

International career
Cantero represented the Spain under-19 national team in 2019 for a pair of friendlies.

References

External links
 Real Madrid profile 
 
 
 

2000 births
Living people
Footballers from Madrid
Spanish footballers
Association football wingers
La Liga players
Segunda División B players
Atlético Levante UD players
Levante UD footballers
Spain youth international footballers